The Federal ICAC Now, also known simply as FIN, is a political party in Australia formed in June 2020. Its creation was driven by the claimed need for an independent federal anti-corruption watchdog, similar to New South Wales, South Australia, and the Northern Territory.

Abbreviated to FIN, the party's logo includes the party name, abbreviation and the dorsal fin of a shark.

Foundation
In October 2020, the party lodged its first application to the Australian Electoral Commission (AEC), to gain federal approval as a political party, claiming it had 510 members. On 2 September 2021, the party's application as a registered political party was approved by the Australian Electoral Commission (AEC), and given a statement of reasons.

Objective
The party's objective, as stated on the party website is:

References
Notes

Citations

External links
  
 

2020 establishments in Australia
Political parties established in 2020
Political parties in Australia
Single-issue political parties in Australia
Anti-corruption parties